4 Mile is an industrial area of Port Moresby, the capital city of Papua New Guinea, located just north of Boroko and south of Gordon.

Suburbs of Port Moresby